Las Cafeteras is a Chicano band from East Los Angeles, California. Their music fuses spoken word and folk music, with traditional Son jarocho and zapateado dancing.

History
The band started out as students of the Eastside Café, a community space in El Sereno, Los Angeles, where they took Son Jarocho classes. Influenced by music from Veracruz, Mexico and eager to teach others about it, they started formally playing in 2005. Since forming, they have shared the stage with artists such as, Caifanes, Lila Downs, Juanes, Ozomatli, Edward Sharpe and the Magnetic Zeroes and the Los Angeles Philharmonic.

Their namesake derives from the organization where they took classes. To honor women, they feminized their group name by naming themselves Las Cafeteras, rather than Los Cafeteros.

Las Cafeteras' songs have themes and references that range from the Civil Rights Movement, United Farm Workers, DREAM Act, immigration reform to female homicides in Ciudad Juárez. Their song, "La Bamba Rebelde", a remake of The traditional Mexican song from the state of Veracruz  "La Bamba", denotes their Chicano pride. They say that they construct their music as a tool for creating positive change and inspiring others to do so.

Band members
 Daniel French — vocals, jarana, MC
 David Flores — requinto jarocho
 Denise Carlos — vocals, jarana, zapateado, glockenspiel
 Jose Cano — cajón, Native American flute, harmonica
 Hector Flores — vocals, zapateado
 Leah Gallegos — vocals, quijada, zapateado

Discography 
Live at Mucho Wednesdays (2009)
It's Time (2012)
Tastes Like L.A. (2017)

References

External links 
 Las Cafeteras Official Website
 Las Cafeteras on facebook
 Las Cafeteras on Twitter

Chicano
Mexican-American culture in Los Angeles
Latin music groups
Latin American music
Musical groups from Los Angeles
Musical groups established in 2005
El Sereno, Los Angeles
American musicians of Mexican descent
Hispanic and Latino American musicians